The Negros Island Region, also abbreviated and officially designated as NIR (unofficially Region XVIII), was a short-lived administrative region in the Philippines which comprised the provinces of Negros Occidental and Negros Oriental, both of which cover the island of Negros, currently proposed for re-establishment. It existed from May 29, 2015, to August 9, 2017. Local officials and the Consultative Committee to Review the 1987 Constitution have proposed to reinstate Negros as a region or state of a Philippine federation.

History

Early initiatives
Negros has history as a single province and as a briefly independent republic. The movement for a single-island region started in the 1980s, when officials from both provinces proposed a one-island, one-region unit. At the time, Negros Occidental and Negros Oriental were the only provinces in the Philippines situated on the same island but belonging to two different administrative regions. Their regional offices were located in Panay and Cebu respectively. This led to the filing of House of Representatives Bill No. 1477 titled "An Act Merging the Province of Negros Occidental and Oriental into One-Island Region". This argued that the two provinces "nestle in one common island; have common fowls and beasts in the forest; share the same soil in our plains and mountains; benefit and suffer together from the rivers that snake through our land; and our ancestors roamed the same length and breadth without complications of political, social, economic, religious and lingual obstacles."

The proposal was continued through talks between former Governor Bitay Lacson of Negros Occidental and the former Governor Emilio Macias of Negros Oriental in 1990. Their successors, former Governor Rafael Coscolluella and former Governor (and later Representative) George Arnaiz took the initiative further, first identifying Kabankalan in Negros Occidental and the neighboring municipality of Mabinay in Negros Oriental, with the two situated on or near the geographic center of the island, as joint regional centers. However, the National Economic and Development Authority (NEDA) turned down the proposal due to a lack of funding.

Revival of proposal
In 2013, the one-island region talks were continued by Negros Oriental Representatives Pryde Henry Teves and George Arnaiz, and Negros Occidental Governor Alfredo Marañon Jr. with Representative Alfredo Marañon III and Coscolluela. They pointed out that, while the creation of a new region would entail substantial costs to the government, it would be advantageous to the people of both provinces because they would not need to travel by sea any more to process transactions in the regional offices. They also claimed that a one-island region would also result in better coordination between both provinces in tourism, peace and order, environment, development planning, disaster management, and road infrastructure. Edward Du, president of the Negros Oriental Chamber of Commerce and Industry, also proposed to convert existing offices of national agencies in the provincial capitals of Bacolod and Dumaguete to sub-regional offices during an interim period if the proposal was approved to defray the costs of establishing a new regional center. Various public officials and representatives from academic, religious, media, and other private sectors aired support for the proposal.

Notably, Negros Oriental Governor Roel Degamo was tagged as being initially opposed to the talks, claiming he was not convinced with a one-island region setup and that his constituents were allegedly not in favor of its creation. He eventually clarified that his original stand as regards the region was being "open" to it and that there were some concerns, such as revenue sharing between the two provinces, that had to be thrashed out first.

President Benigno Aquino III directed the Department of the Interior and Local Government (DILG) to study the establishment of a new region. The DILG subsequently endorsed the proposal, noting that the new region would mean integrated planning for holistic development, disaster management, tourism promotion, and peace and order management. NEDA affirmed by saying that its studies show that the proposed region is economically viable.

Establishment
On May 29, 2015, President Aquino signed Executive Order 183, joining the twin Negros provinces into one region — the Negros Island Region. It separated Negros Occidental and its capital Bacolod from Western Visayas (Region VI) and Negros Oriental from Central Visayas (Region VII), raising the total number of regions of the Philippines to 18.

Dissolution and future

On August 9, 2017, President Duterte signed Executive Order No. 38, finally revoking the Executive Order No. 183 signed by former President Benigno Aquino III in 2015. The official reason given by Secretary of Budget and Management Benjamín Diokno was the lack of funds needed to fully establish Negros as a functioning region. Earlier, Diokno had notably been dismissive of the region's continued existence, being quoted as saying, "Well, you don't want to spend ₱19 billion for such [a] two-province region. In any event, [even] with ... federalism, that region will not be created [as it would seem] useless."

Its dissolution upset the NIR regional officials and saddened Negrenses. However, many Negrense politicians are pushing for a "Negros Federal State", and are exploring the possibility of creating a Negros Development Alliance. Due to the rise of the Philippine government's conversion into federalism under President Rodrigo Duterte, Negros Island Region may have had the capability to become a separate federal state. There have also been proposals by House of Representatives Speaker Pantaleón Álvarez to move some governmental offices to the Negros Region from Metro Manila, once the nation transitions into the federal government, due to the island's strategic location between Luzon and Mindanao, as well as its vast areas which could accommodate the government offices to be built in there. However, Álvarez' proposal has not yet been approved by the majority of PDP-Laban members and its chairman, Koko Pimentel. Technicalities prevent Pimentel from approving the proposal as the region had already been abolished by Duterte in 2017.

To address the quantitative concerns of those who frown upon the existence of a two-province region, the reintegration of Siquijor, currently part of Central Visayas, into historical Negros had been floated as an idea by then-Interior Secretary Mar Roxas on his visits to both Negros Occidental and Negros Oriental. On average, it takes five hours to reach the regional offices located in Cebú, while only an hour to get to Dumaguete in Negros Oriental. Siquijor used to be a part and later on a sub-province of Negros Oriental, finally splitting off from it on September 17, 1971.

To date, there also exists an informal proposal for a Cebuano Visayan State ruled under a common federal government. The ethnic and territorial claims of the proposed region, however, overlap with those of Negros, whether as a former sovereign republic or a Philippine subdivision, and Bohol, whose Cebuano-speaking natives nonetheless identify as a distinct people.

Proposed reestablishment
In May 2020, during the height of the COVID-19 pandemic in the Philippines, Bacolod Vice Mayor El Cid Familiaran asserted the need to revive the Negros Island Region. On July 1, 2022, House Bill 330 was filed by Negros Occidental 2nd District Representative Alfredo Marañon III, which seeks to reestablish the region. Five months later, on December 5, five bills filed in the Senate to reestablish the Negros Island Region were approved.

As of March 6, 2023, the House Bill 7355 or the Negros Island Region Bill, which will now expand the previous NIR with the inclusion of Siquijor, was passed on the third and final reading at the House of Representatives. The measure is expected to hurdle the Senate, as the Senate bill is sponsored by Senate President Juan Miguel Zubiri, who has roots from Kabankalan City, Negros Occidental.

Administrative divisions

The Negros Island Region was composed of two provinces, one highly urbanized city, 18 component cities, 38 municipalities, and 1,219 barangays.

At the time of its existence, the Negros Island Region had the fewest provinces in the Philippines (only two), but had 19 cities (18 component cities and the highly urbanized city of Bacolod) in total, making it the region with the most cities amongst the Visayas regions, tying alongside Calabarzon in Luzon, which also has 19 cities. Bacolod was the most populous city of the region and the center of the Bacolod Metropolitan Area (which also contains the cities of Talisay and Silay), as well as the 19th most populous city of the whole Philippines, while Dumaguete was the most densely populated city in the whole region.

Negros Occidental has the most chartered cities amongst all the provinces in the Philippines. The province comprises 13 cities and 19 municipalities, which are further subdivided into 601 barangays. Although Bacolod serves as the capital, it is governed independently from its corresponding province as a highly urbanized city. Negros Oriental comprises 6 cities and 19 municipalities, with 557 barangays.

References

 
Visayas
Defunct regions of the Philippines
States and territories disestablished in 2017
2015 establishments in the Philippines
2017 disestablishments in the Philippines
Establishments by Philippine executive order